Puebla de Don Fadrique is a municipality located in the province of Granada, Spain. According to the 2007 census (INE), the city has a population of 2,565 inhabitants.

Villages
Puebla de Don Fadrique

References

External links 

 Puebla de Don Fadrique in Turgranada
 Puebla de Don Fadrique picture

 

Municipalities in the Province of Granada